Eliran Guetta (born January 23, 1975) is an Israeli professional basketball player for Maccabi Hadera of the Liga Artzit.

Honours
Domestic Cup:
Runner-up (1): 2010–11
Liga Leumit:
Winner (1): 2008–09
Regular season championship (2): 2007–08, 2008–09
Association Cup:
Winner (1): 2009

References

1975 births
Living people
Israeli men's basketball players
Israeli Basketball Premier League players
Power forwards (basketball)
Hapoel Migdal HaEmek B.C. players
Israeli people of Libyan-Jewish descent
People from Hadera